Sattleria melaleucella is a moth in the family Gelechiidae. It was described by Constant in 1865. It is found in the Apennines and Alps of France, Germany, Austria, Switzerland and Italy.

The length of the forewings is 7.3-11.6 mm for males and 5.8-8.5 mm for females. The forewings lack a dark stripe along the fold and may have irregular dark transverse bands. Adults are on wing from July to mid-September.

The larvae feed on Cerastium latifolium and Cerastium uniflorum. They live in a silken tube spun along parts of the host plant. Pupation takes place in a silken cocoon spun under a stone or under parts of the host plant.

References

Sattleria
Moths described in 1865